This is a list of the weekly Canadian RPM magazine number-one Top Singles chart of 1965.

See also
1965 in music

List of Billboard Hot 100 number ones of 1965 (United States)
List of number-one singles in Canada

References
Notes

External links
 RPM Magazine at the AV Trust
 RPM charts at Library and Archives Canada

 
Canada Singles
1965